01 or 01 may refer to:

 The year 2001, or any year ending with 01
 The month of January
 1 (number)

Music
 '01 (Richard Müller album), 2001
 01 (Son of Dave album), 2000
 01 (Urban Zakapa album), 2011
 O1 (Hiroyuki Sawano album), 2015
 01011001, the seventh studio album from Arjen Anthony Lucassen's Ayreon project

Other uses
 01 (telephone number), United Kingdom internal dialing code for London between the late 1950s and 1990
 Lynk & Co 01, a compact SUV built since 2017
 Zero One also known as Machine City, a city-state from the Matrix series 
 Kolmogorov's zero-one law, a law of probability theory
 Pro Wrestling ZERO1-MAX, a wrestling promotion formerly known as Pro Wrestling ZERO-ONE
 BAR 01, a Formula One chassis
 The number of the French department Ain
 The codename given to the Wing Gundam by Oz in the anime Gundam Wing

See also 
 One (disambiguation)
 O1 (disambiguation)